The Medici giraffe was a giraffe presented to Lorenzo de' Medici on November 18, 1487, by al-Ashraf Qaitbay, the Burji Mamluk Sultan of Egypt, in an attempt to win the support of the Medici.

The first live giraffe in Europe and Italy since Ancient Rome, the Medici giraffe caused a great stir on its arrival in Florence. Although the Medici maintained a large menagerie and had previously featured a giant wooden model of a giraffe in the animal entertainments they provided to the citizenry, this was the first time a living example had been seen in the city.

The Medici giraffe did not survive for long, dying in January 1488; another giraffe was not seen in Europe for almost 300 years.

Background

Cosimo's wooden giraffe 
When Cosimo received Pope Pius II and Galeazzo Maria Sforza in April 1459, he assembled animal combat spectacles, including "a wild boar, two horses, four bulls, two young buffalo, some goats, a cow, and a calf" plus "twenty-six lions". The lions were borrowed from Florence while Cosimo was responsible for other expenses. However, the lions got bored and lost interest in other animals since they had been fed too well. Lions, which were fierce and proud symbols of Florence, were unwilling to demonstrate their power, placing Cosimo's stature at risk.

In an attempt to spur the lions into action, Cosimo sent a "Trojan giraffe", a wooden giraffe containing armed warriors inside, to excite the lions and save his reputation. However, the lions remained bored.

Witnessing his grandfather's catastrophic spectacle, Lorenzo realized that he would not achieve absolute respect from his peers with money alone, and that he needed real political power at home and abroad.

Caesar's giraffe 
In 46 BC, Caesar staged a series of spectacular triumphs to celebrate his accomplishments in defeating Pompey, conquering Asia Minor and Egypt, and asserting his power back in Rome. A parade of lions, leopards, black panthers, baboons, green monkeys, Egyptian saluki dogs, parrots, flamingos, and ostriches marched through the streets. Among those animals was a unique creature – a giraffe that the Romans called the "cameleopard", as its characteristics seemed to be a combination of camel and leopard. Caesar's giraffe, which was promptly killed by lions, was the first to be brought to Europe, facilitating his power solidification in Rome. Although Lorenzo and Caesar had much in common—attaining success despite internal and external enemies, winning respect despite being accused of violating republican principles and becoming tyrants, and being an object of assassination conspiracies—he did not intend to emulate Caesar.

It is unclear when Lorenzo first thought of obtaining a giraffe. He might have been greatly interested in Caesar's triumphs and his giraffe due to owning Dio Cassius's Roman History and Pliny the Elder's Natural History in his library, both of which described Caesar's animal parade. Lorenzo saw the giraffe as part of "his multilayered strategy of social ascent" while putting more focus and effort into art collections, and believed a live giraffe would enable him to enhance his reputation.

Medici's giraffe

Historical context 
In 1422, the Florentine government had concluded a commercial treaty with the sultan of Egypt and Syria, initiating a marine line for goods transportation to and from the East; however, no significant achievements emerged from these efforts. In the mid-1480s, after the post-Pazzi conspiracy wars, the Florentines decided to try again to help develop the state. The Florentines preferred trading directly with Egypt instead of working through intermediaries like the Venetians. To create new trading relations between Florence and Egypt, Paolo da Colle, a Florentine ambassador, went to the court of the sultan of Egypt in Cairo, which was under the Qaitbay's Mamluk dynasty, in 1485. It is believed that, while in Egypt, da Colle had found what Lorenzo was longing for: a giraffe.

During this time, the Ottoman sultan Bayezid II threatened the Mamluk territories. Bayezid's political problem, a dynastic struggle between Bayezid and his brother Cem, kept him from waging war on Egypt. If he returned to Egypt, Cem could have been a deterrent to Bayezid's aggression or could have even overthrown his brother with Qaitbay's aid. 

At the same time, Pope Innocent VIII benefited from taking the custody of Cem since Bayezid had threatened to invade Europe. As such, this could assist Qaitbay's strategy, as Cem leading Christian armies against Bayezid would keep him from attacking Egypt, which only occurred if the French agreed to give up Cem. In return, the Medici would acquire a long-standing friendship with the French whilst forging a familial relationship with Pope Innocent VIII. Thus, Lorenzo could help resolve Qaitbay's dilemma, and Paolo da Colle was in an ideal position to negotiate with Egypt's sultan.

Diplomatic use 
Given the intense relations between Egypt and the Ottoman Empire, it is unclear why Qaitbay stole presents that an ambassador from India had brought to Bayezid in 1485. Inevitably, Bayezid was "on the warpath against him". Qaitbay wrote to France, where Cem was kept, discussing Cem's transfer to Egypt. After asking for Lorenzo's diplomatic assistance, Qaitbay and Lorenzo agreed: "a giraffe for an Ottoman prince", which also facilitated securing Lorenzo's prestige. This giraffe represented Qaitbay's efforts "to establish good diplomatic relations with the Florentines in order to make them intervene on their behalf in the inter-Muslim conflict."

Lorenzo then offered Anne of France to forward a giraffe to her in exchange for her aid. The giraffe would help amplify "Lorenzo's stature as a prince wielding international authority" if he could obtain and use the giraffe as a diplomatic tool with France. This giraffe also served as a negotiating instrument with his Italian allies, the Ferdinand I of Naples and the Duke of Milan. They were hesitant to strike a mutual assistance agreement with Lorenzo. Another advantage of keeping this giraffe was enhancing Lorenzo's persuasive negotiation with the Pope for a cardinal's hat for his son, Giovanni de' Medici.

On November 11, 1487, the giraffe arrived in Florence with other exotic animals, and seven days later it was officially presented to Lorenzo.

Another issue that Qaitbay wanted Lorenzo to settle in June 1488 was the Pope's permission to buy weapons. The Venetians ignored the arms sales ban issued by the Pope and kept selling arms to the Ottomans while deleting such traces in their records, leading to Qaitbay's request to Lorenzo to negotiate with the Pope. The weapons were permitted for purchase with papal authorization on January 17, 1489. Regarding Cem's custody, he was brought from France to Rome in March 1489. Cem died in February 1495 in Capua, where he accompanied King Charles VIII of France, Anne's brother, to march south. 

Lorenzo enjoyed the fruits of his giraffe diplomacy. His daughter Maddalena married Franceschetto Cibo, the illegitimate son of Pope Innocent VIII, in January 1488. In March 1489, his thirteen-year-old son, Giovanni, was made a cardinal. Anne of France would never receive her despite her longing for the giraffe. Still, the giraffe was one of Lorenzo's political tools that leveraged his prestige due to its contribution to his influence with the Pope.

Death 
The giraffe died in January 1488 after her head got stuck in the rafters of the barn she was stored in. Panicked, she broke her neck when jerking her head too hard and died.

Other giraffes 
It was reported that "giraffes were also kept at other Italian courts; for instance, by Alphonso II, Duke of Calabria, in his villa Poggio Reale, and by Duke Hercules I in the Barco Park at Ferrara". If they had existed, they had certainly not had the fame that Lorenzo's giraffe enjoyed: it was immortalized in paintings and frescos by Botticini, Vasari, and Bacchiacca. In East Asia, a giraffe was brought to Beijing in 1414 from Bengal as a tributary gift. The second giraffe was later dispatched directly from the city of Melinda in 1421 to the emperor with much celebration and fanfare.

A living giraffe was not seen in Europe again until Muhammad Ali Pasha sent three Nubian giraffes as gifts in 1820s: one to Charles X of France in 1826, one to George IV of the United Kingdom in 1827, and one to Francis II of the Holy Roman Empire. Each caused a stir in Paris, London, and Vienna respectively. The first, the female giraffe known today as Zarafa, survived for more than two years and was later put in the Jardin des Plantes.

Gallery

Frescos and paintings

Details

See also 
 Zarafa

References

Bibliography

External links 

Medieval individual animals
Individual giraffes
1487 in Europe
15th century in the Republic of Florence
Animals as diplomatic gifts